Designated terrorist organisations in Australia are organisations that have been designated by the Australian government as terrorist organisations. A list of terrorist organisations was first created under the Security Legislation Amendment (Terrorism) Act 2002, as part of the fight against terrorism worldwide.

History

The Security Legislation Amendment (Terrorism) Act 2002 was passed by the Australian Parliament, "enabling Australian governments to deal with organisations involved in terrorism", and inserted a range of terrorist organisation offences into the Criminal Code Act 1995 (Cth). For example, the Act made it an offence to materially support or be supported by a listed terrorist organisation.

Oversight and monitoring
The list of designated terror organisations is maintained by the Attorney-General's Department. For listing as a terrorist organisation, an organisation may be found to be such by a court as part of a prosecution for a terrorist offence or the designation may be made by regulation upon the motion of the Attorney-General of Australia under Division 102 of the Criminal Code Act 1995. Listing, de-listing and re-listing follows a protocol that mainly involves the Australian Security Intelligence Organisation and the Attorney-General's Department. Such action in general is not made with reference to designations made or proposed by other countries or multinational organisations.

Under Division 103 of the Criminal Code Act 1995, it is illegal to finance terrorism. The Australian Transaction Reports and Analysis Centre (AUSTRAC) monitors financial transactions involving listed terrorist organisations.

List of designated terrorist organisations
 the Australian government lists 28 foreign organisations as terrorist organisations:

Hamas was listed in July 2014, but was removed from the list by January 2015. Hamas was reinstated in 2022.

The Base and the entirety of Hezbollah were added on 24 November 2021.

Terrorism financing laws 
Australian anti-terrorism financing laws include:

 Criminal Code Act 1995 (Cth):
 section 102.6 – getting funds to, from or for a terrorist organisation
 section 102.7 – providing support to a terrorist organisation
 section 103.1 – financing terrorism
 section 103.2 – financing a terrorist, and 
 section 119.4(5) – giving or receiving goods and services to promote the commission of a foreign incursion offence.
 Charter of the United Nations Act 1945 (Cth):
 section 20 – dealing with freezable assets, and 
 section 21 – giving an asset to a proscribed person or entity.

These offences sanction persons and entities under Australian and international law. The responsibility of prosecuting these offences in Australia rests with the Australian Federal Police, state police forces and the Commonwealth Director of Public Prosecutions.

See also
Anti-Terrorism Act 2005
Australian anti-terrorism legislation, 2004
List of designated terrorist groups
Terrorism in Australia

References

Australian crime-related lists
Commonwealth of Australia laws
 
Terrorism laws in Australia
Terrorism-related lists